Porky's Super Service is a 1937 Warner Bros. Looney Tunes animated short film directed by Ub Iwerks. The short film, starring Porky Pig, was released on July 3, 1937.

Plot
Porky Pig works at a gas station and has to deal with a brat baby that won't stop bothering him, such as getting him stuck in an engine.

Colorized versions

This cartoon was redrawn colorized in 1968, this version had every other frame redrawn, which affected the animation quality. It was later computer colorized in 1995, this version preserved the original animation.

Home media
The short film was released on the Kid Galahad (1937 film) DVD, along with two other Warner Brothers cartoons Egghead Rides Again and I Wanna Be a Sailor.

References

External links
 
 Big Cartoon Database

Looney Tunes shorts
Warner Bros. Cartoons animated short films
1936 films
Films directed by Ub Iwerks
Porky Pig films
1936 animated films
American black-and-white films
1930s Warner Bros. animated short films